The 1992 Perth and Kinross District Council election took place on the 7 May 1992 to elect members of Perth and Kinross District Council, as part of that years Scottish local elections.

Aggregate results

References

1992 Scottish local elections
1992